Nathiba Hargovandas Lakhmichand (NHL) Municipal Medical College (NHLMMC), is a Municipal Medical College located in Ahmedabad, Gujarat, India affiliated with the Gujarat University. The Medical College was established by the Ahmedabad Municipal Corporation (AMC) in 1963, which became only the second Municipal Corporation in India to establish its own Medical College.

History 
At the time of its establishment in 1963 by Amritlal Hargovinddas, Smt. Nathiba Hargovandas Lakhmichand Municipal Medical College initially enrolled 75 students and expanded to its capacity of 150 in the year 2000. Recently from 2016, MCI has increased that intake to 250 per year, which is the maximum number of annual U.G. admissions for any medical college in India.

NHL College 

The Medical College confers a degree of M.B.B.S after a study period of 5.5 years (which includes a Compulsory Rotating Medical Internship). It is located in the affluent area of Paldi in Ahmedabad, India. It is affiliated with the Gujarat University. 

The College is affiliated to 5 city hospitals where the medical students rotate for their training; 

1. Sardar Vallabhbhai Patel Institute of Medical Science and Research(SVPIMSR), Ellisbridge, Ahmedabad   

2. Smt. Shardaben (S.C.L.) General Hospital, Saraspur, Ahmedabad 

3.  Shri C.H. Nagri Eye Hospital, Ellisbridge, Ahmedabad  

4. Infectious Disease Hospital, Jamalpur, Ahmedabad 

5. Tuberculosis and Chest Diseases Hospital, Astodia, Ahmedabad.

During their internship, students also rotate through the various Urban and Rural Health Centers in the greater Ahmedabad area to gain exposure to Community Medicine. The college has good facilities, such as two fully air-conditioned reading rooms for students, 7 A.C. lecture halls with smart boards and projectors, one air-conditioned Central Library, a gymkhana, one table tennis room, and comfortable hostel with strict anti-ragging rules.

References

External links
 Official website

Medical colleges in Gujarat
Universities and colleges in Ahmedabad
Gujarat University
Educational institutions established in 1963
1963 establishments in Gujarat